Events from the year 1765 in Russia

Incumbents
 Monarch – Catherine II

Events

 Foundation of the Novodevichii Institute.

Births

 
 date unknown
 Pyotr Bagration, Russian general (d. 1812)

Deaths

 
 
 
 
 April 15 – Mikhail Lomonosov, Russian author and scientist (b. 1711)

References

1765 in Russia
Years of the 18th century in the Russian Empire